John McFarland may refer to:

 John McFarland (Medal of Honor recipient) (1840–1881)
 John Henry MacFarland (1851–1935), Irish–Australian University Chancellor
 John McFarland (baseball), American baseball player
 John McFarland (ice hockey) (born 1992)
 Sir John McFarland, 1st Baronet (1848-1926) of the McFarland Baronets
 Jack McFarland, fictional character
 John Leslie McFarland, American writer of popular songs